Ryan Manalac (born October 20, 1985 in Pickerington, Ohio) is a former American football linebacker for the Cincinnati Bearcats and Buffalo Bills and is the current linebackers coach for the Pittsburgh Panthers. After graduating from Cincinnati, he was signed by the Bills as an undrafted free agent in 2009, and cut on August 16, 2010. He then entered the coaching profession.

External links
Buffalo Bills bio
Cincinnati Bearcats bio
Bucknell Bison DC bio

1985 births
Living people
People from Pickerington, Ohio
Players of American football from Ohio
American football linebackers
Cincinnati Bearcats football players
Buffalo Bills players
Coaches of American football from Ohio
Michigan State Spartans football coaches
Valparaiso Beacons football coaches
Ohio Dominican Panthers football coaches
Bucknell Bison football coaches
Pittsburgh Panthers football coaches